David II may refer to:

 Davit II, Caucasian Albanian Catholicos in 765–769
 David II of Scotland, King of Scotland from 1329 to 1371
 David II Magistros of Tao-Klarjeti (died 937)
 David II of Klarjeti (died 993)
 David II of Lori (fl. 1111–1118)
 David II of Georgia, the Builder, King in 1089–1125
 David II Strathbogie, Earl of Atholl (died in 1326)
 David II, Catholicos-Patriarch of Georgia, ruled in 1426–1428
 Dawit II of Ethiopia (1501–1540)
 David II of Kakheti (1678–1722)
 David II of Imereti (1756–1795)